Ginette Marotte is politician in Montreal, Quebec, Canada. She served on the Montreal city council from 2005 to 2013 and was mayor of the Verdun borough council from 2012 to 2013.

Borough councillor
Marotte was elected for the Champlain division on the Verdun borough council in the 2001 Montreal municipal election as a candidate of Gérald Tremblay's Montreal Island Citizens Union (MICU). She served for a full four-year term. MICU held all of the borough council's five seats in this period, which coincided with Tremblay's first term as mayor.

City councillor and borough mayor
Marotte was elected to the Montreal city council in the 2005 municipal election for the Champlain–L'Île-des-Sœurs division. Tremblay was elected to a second term as mayor in this election, and MICU won a majority of seats on council; Marotte subsequently served as a backbench supporter of the administration. She also continued to serve on the Verdun borough council by virtue of holding her position on city council and was appointed to chair the borough's environment committee. In September 2009, she and borough mayor Claude Trudel introduced the first composter acquired by a municipal administration in Quebec.

Marotte was re-elected to city council as a member of the renamed Union Montreal party in the 2009 municipal election. She continued to serve as chair of the borough environment committee and also served on the city's committee on transport and environmental management.

Gerald Tremblay's administration became engulfed in a serious corruption scandal in late 2012, and Tremblay resigned as mayor on November 5, 2012. Marotte resigned from Union Montreal shortly thereafter to sit as an independent. Claude Trudel also resigned as borough mayor of Verdun in December 2012, and Marotte was chosen by the other council members as his replacement. She served in this position for a year and did not seek re-election in the 2013 municipal election.

During her second term on city council, Marotte served as associate councillor responsible for sustainable development, the environment, and parks, and for Mosaïcultures Internationales Montréal 2013.

Electoral record

References

Living people
Montreal city councillors
People from Verdun, Quebec
Year of birth missing (living people)
Coalition Avenir Québec politicians
21st-century Canadian politicians
Women in Quebec politics
Women municipal councillors in Canada
21st-century Canadian women politicians